Duke Homestead State Historic Site is a state historic site and National Historic Landmark in Durham, North Carolina.  The site belongs to the North Carolina Department of Natural and Cultural resources and commemorates the place where Washington Duke founded the nation's largest early-20th-century tobacco firm, the American Tobacco Company.

History

During the war, the property was, like many others, looted by Union Army. With little left beyond a small supply of tobacco, the family shifted from tobacco farming to tobacco processing, introducing cigarettes in 1881 to compete with loose-leaf tobacco.  

This property is where the Dukes did their early tobacco processing, eventually moving into downtown Durham in 1874.  The Duke business was incorporated as the American Tobacco Company in 1890, and was the largest tobacco company in the world until an antitrust suit broke it up in 1911. 

In 1931, the farm was purchased by Duke University, and in 1966, the Duke Homestead was designated a National Historic Landmark by the National Park Service. It became a North Carolina State Historic Site in 1974, administered by the North Carolina State Division of Archives and History.

Description

The very first building in which they worked, a log barn, was destroyed by fire, and was reconstructed in 1931.

Museum
Today, the site is a museum where tourists can view the restored 1852 Duke Homestead with four furnished rooms, tobacco barns and various artifacts. The visitor center features the Tobacco Museum, with exhibits about tobacco farming, processing and the history of tobacco.  Various readings and presentations are available in the Visitor Center.

See also
List of National Historic Landmarks in North Carolina
National Register of Historic Places listings in Durham County, North Carolina

References

External links
 Duke Homestead and Tobacco Museum
 Duke Homestead  - North Carolina State Historic Sites

Museums in Durham, North Carolina
Historic house museums in North Carolina
D
Open-air museums in North Carolina
National Historic Landmarks in North Carolina
Houses completed in 1852
Duke family residences
History of Durham, North Carolina
Buildings and structures in Durham, North Carolina
University museums in North Carolina
Agriculture museums in the United States
North Carolina State Historic Sites
Industrial buildings and structures on the National Register of Historic Places in North Carolina
Tobacco buildings in the United States
National Register of Historic Places in Durham County, North Carolina
Houses in Durham, North Carolina
1852 establishments in North Carolina